Paul Lin Ta-kuang (simplified Chinese: 林达光; traditional Chinese: 林達光; pinyin:  Lín Dáguāng; Wade–Giles: Lin Ta-kuang (March 14, 1920 – July 4, 2004) was a Canadian-Chinese political scientist and peace activist, the founding Director of McGill's Center for East Asian Studies (1965-1982) and Rector of the University of East Asia in Macau (now Macau University) from 1986 to 1988.

Biography

Youth in Canada 
Son of George Lim Yuen (Lin Zuoran 林佐然) (1882-1967) and Chiu Mon Som 趙文琛 (1882-1938);  marries Eileen Siu-Tsung Chen (1924-) 陳恕. They had two sons, Christopher 林凱 (1945-1966) and Douglas 林潮 (1949-).

His father was an Anglican clergyman, the first Chinese to become one in Canada. He had two brothers: David 林達威  (1915-2002) and Andrew 林達文. David became an important doctor; he married Florence Hsi 席與萱, daughter of financier Turpin Hsi 席德柄 (1891-1968) and was a close friend of Sun Ke 孫科 (1891-1973), son of Sun Yatsen  孫中山. Andrew married Sun Ke's daughter, Pearl Sun 孫穗英 (1922-). Paul was close to the Sun family, and to the politically prominent widow of Sun Yatsen, Madame Soong Ching-ling 宋慶齡 (1893–1981), also through his wife Eileen, whose father Chen Xing  陳行 (1890-1953) was the right hand of T. V. Soong or Soong Tzu-wen 宋子文(1891-1971), Soong Ching-ling's brother.

He attended the University of British Columbia (UBC) for one year (1938–39) and then moved to the United States.

Student years in the United States 
He entered the University of Michigan, Ann Arbor, in 1939 to study engineering, but soon found out that “his academic interests lay elsewhere, in International law “which could be used to defend China’s interests”; he graduated in this field in 1943. At Ann Arbor he engaged in public speaking, winning the first prize at the 1942 Northern Oratorical League with a speech supporting Chinese war effort against Japan. He also became a member of the Chinese Students’ Christian Association (CSCA), then the oldest and most influential Chinese Student Group in America, which was becoming growingly politicized due to the pressure of the Sino-Japanese War. He would become the Association's president in 1944. By that time he had moved to Cambridge, Massachusetts, to study at the Fletcher School of Law and Diplomacy and at Harvard. With the end of the war against Japan, as China descended into Civil War between Nationalists and Communists, the CSCA became more and more critical of the Nationalist regime and of American support of it against Communism. Feeling the increasingly hostile political climate in the United States he decided to move to China with his family in 1949, before finishing his dissertation at Harvard. In 1951 the CSCA was disbanded and restraining orders prohibited most Chinese students to return to the PRC.

Chinese years 1949-1964  
In China, he became close to premier Zhou Enlai, thanks to his contacts with a prominent returned Chinese academic he knew from Michigan and Harvard, Pu Shouchang 浦壽昌 (1922-2019). He also became close to Soong Ching-ling, to whom he had family connections through his brother Andrew as well as through his wife.

He worked variously as a freelance translator of contemporary Chinese literature and editor of an English-language international news bulletin. He was also a broadcaster and Artistic Director of English-language services in Radio Peking. He edited and narrated documentary films on China for the Central Documentary Film Studio. Towards the end of his stay, he was professor of international law and relations at Huaqiao University. In 1958, he took part in the first wave of "intellectuals sent down to the countryside" and spent a year working with the peasants in a poverty-stricken village in North China.

Shortly before the start of the Cultural Revolution, Song Qinglin advised him to return to Canada with his family.

Return to Canada and role in the détente towards China (1964-1970) 
He returned to Vancouver in 1964. After a brief period of teaching at UBC, in 1965 he was offered a position at McGill, to teach Chinese History and head a new Centre for East Asian studies. Lin took the lead in building the university's Department of East Asian Studies from scratch as McGill buried its history of the once prominent School of Chinese Studies and Gest Chinese Research Library between 1928 and 1937. At the time, he was considered a controversial figure, object of a series of hostile editorials and reports inspired by Nationalist regime in Taiwan. Even his brother David, due to his loyalty to the Chinese Nationalist government, of which he was an overseas representative in Canada, grew estranged from him. The death of his son Christopher in a car accident close to the border between the US and Canada in August 1966, raised a strong but unproven suspicion that it was a hit arranged by the Nationalist government as a warning to his father, a not unusual strategy at the time.

He was one of the most influential voices advocating the recognition of China, most prominently at the 1966 Banff conference bringing together academics and foreign and Canadian diplomats, and at the 1967 Geneva convocation based on Pope John XXIII’s encyclical Pacem in Terris (Peace on Earth). In 1969 he organized the McGill’s China Consultation, bringing together Canadian as well as American academic and public figures with the aim to improve Sino-Canadian and Sino-American relations. On the Canadian side, this was an important step leading to the official recognition of October 1970 by the recently elected Trudeau government. On the American side, in January 1970 Henry Kissinger sent an associate of his, Ernst Florian Winter, to ask Lin to relay a confidential message to Zhou Enlai conveying Kissinger’s desire to meet Chinese leaders in view of a visit by President Nixon to China. Lin soon thereafter went to China to relay the message and meet Zhou Enlai, staying from May to October 1970. At his return he was the object of a parliamentary interrogation accusing Pierre Trudeau of planning to nominate Lin the first ambassador to China.

Later role as mediator and as academic (1970-1988) 
While not receiving any such nomination, Lin was generally perceived as an advisor to Trudeau and Kissinger and served for the following years as one of the main informal channels between China and Canadian and American politicians, journalists and academics

Beside this informal role Lin was a key player in developing economic ties between Canada and China, where in 1978 he led a ground-breaking trade delegation. He also advocated the formation of the Canada-China Business Council which remains a flourishing organization to date.

On November 26, 1979, Deng Xiaoping met Lin and Frank Gibney of the US Encyclopædia Britannica. During the meeting Deng announced a new stance on economic policy, introducing the concept of socialist market economy. Answering a question by Lin about past restrictions on the role of a market economy in China, Deng clarified: "why can't there be a market economy in socialism"? We can't say that this is capitalism. Our planned economy is in the primary position; it integrates with the market economy, but this is a socialist market economy."

He participated to the International dialogue with the Chinese Churches in Montreal, October 1981 where he met with his longtime friend K. H. Ting 丁光訓 (1915- 2012), then Anglican bishop of Zhejiang and a prominent figure in Chinese Christianity.

He retired from McGill in 1982.

In 1984 he collaborated with Gary Bush at the Canadian short documentary film "The Children of Soong Ching-ling", which was nominated for an Academy Award for Best Documentary Short.

He was appointed as rector of University of East Asia (later Macau University) in 1986. In his role as rector he conferred an honorary Doctor of Law degree on the former U.S. Secretary of State, Henry Kissinger, and the former Canadian Prime Minister, Pierre Elliott Trudeau. In 1988 he resigned as the Rector of the University of East Asia, due to the restriction of academic freedom under the Macau Government’s policy.

Later political activism and last years (1989-2004) 
After his resignation, Lin settled back in Vancouver and became an Honorary Professor in the Institute of Asian Research at the University of British Columbia. He established and chaired the Institute's China Program for Integrative Research and Development and was appointed to the UBC Senate in 1994.

He played a role in organizing a number of Vancouver's civic societies.

After 1989, he became a vocal critic of Tiananmen repression.

In 1998 he became a Member of the Order of Canada, the highest national honor.

Equally active in community and charitable services, Lin set up a personal charity and donated steadily in support of children, hospitals, arts and social services in Vancouver. The Lin couple founded the Soong Ching Ling Children's Foundation of Canada which is devoted to linking the people of Canada and China, and promoting the education, health and welfare of children.

During the last years of his life he worked on his autobiography, completed by his wife Eileen Chen Lin In the Eye of the China Storm: A Life Between East & West (Montreal: McGill-Queen's University Press, 2011)

Personal engagement 
 Soong Ching Ling Children's Foundation of Canada
 Scholarship in memory of his son Christopher (1945-1966)

Awards 
In 1992, the Hong Kong Society of Chinese Scholars named him the "Most Distinguished Chinese Scholar."

Lin was named a member of the Order of Canada in 1998, the highest national honor, by the Governor-General of Canada in Ottawa in recognition of his lifelong commitment to fostering Canada-China relations.

In the words of a close friend and colleague, Lin was "a truly great Canadian and a great Chinese", a man who lived "a life of principle and a life of courage."

List of publications 
"The change of values in contemporary China." Abridged transcript of an oral presentation given at the Report of a North American Working Party on "the Rise of China": Held Under the Auspices of the Political Commission of the World Student Christian Federation as a Part of the China Study Project at La Solitude, Montreal, Canada, January 7–13, 1968, pp. 197–209.

"Historical Perspectives on Contemporary China", lead chapter in book, Contemporary China, Canadian Institute of International Affairs, 1968.

"Beyond Coexistence", in Beyond Coexistence: The Requirements of peace, ed. by Edward Reed, New York, Grossman Publishers, 1968.

"Education in China", chapter in China: A Century of Struggle, Canadian Institute of International Affairs, 1971.

"Medicine in China", Center Magazine, Center for the Study of Democratic Institutions, Santa Barbara, California, June 1974.

"War or Peace: The State of the Globe", Symposium Transcript, U. of Pennsylvania, 1974

"Development guided by Values: Comments on China's Road and its Implications", concluding chapter of book entitled On the Creation of a Just World Order, ed. by Saul H. Mendlowitz, New York, The Free Press (MacMillan), 1975.

"Historical Perspectives on Chinese Development Strategies", chapter in Global Goals, ed. by Dr. Ervin Laszlo, for the Club of Rome, 1977.

"Endogenous Intellectual Creativity & the Emerging New International Order", United Nations University Asian Symposium, Kyoto University, 1978

"China's New Stage of Development", monograph in Research Series, Graduate School of Business, Columbia U., 1981

"China after the storm." World link. Sept.-Oct. 1989. p. 48-49.

TV and Cinema Documentaries 
10 part educational TV series on modern Chinese history broadcast by CTV television network 1968-1969.

1984 Documentary "The Children of Soong Ching-ling".

Personal papers 
 https://web.archive.org/web/20151118023245/http://library.ust.hk/info/paul-lin/pltk-intro.html

Notes

References 
 Baum, Richard, China Watcher: Confessions of a Peking Tom. University of Washington Press, 2010.
 Evans, Brian L., Pursuing China: memoir of a beaver liaison officer. Edmonton: University of Alberta Press, 2012.
 Evans, Paul M., Engaging China: myth, aspiration, and strategy in Canadian policy from Trudeau to Harper. Toronto: University of Toronto Press, 2014.
 Huang, Annian 黃安年. 沉默的道钉 : 建设北美铁路的华工 The Silent Spikes: Chinese Laborers and the Construction of North American Railroads. 北京 : 五洲传播出版社, 2006.
 Lai, H. Mark, Chinese American transnational politics. Urbana: University of Illinois Press, 2010.
 Lan, Kenneth, East-West Exposure 101: Professors who brought East Asian Studies to Canada. Bloomington, IN: Author Solutions Inc., 2019.
 Lan, Kenneth, "Teaching Chinese in Canada: Epics of three Chinese scholars", Asian Education and Development Studies, Vol. 8, Issue 1 (2019), pp. 38–46
 Lary, Diana, China's civil war: a social history, 1945-1949. Cambridge: Cambridge University Press, 2015
 Lee, Orlan, Moral order and the criminal law: reform efforts in the United States and West Germany, The Hague, Nijhoff, 1973.
 Li Ningyu 李宁玉, 楓骨中華魂 : 紀念百年前修建加拿大铁鐵路的中國人 Canadian steel Chinese grit: a tribute to the Chinese who worked on Canada's railroads more than a century ago. 昆明 : 云南人民出版社, 2000.
 Liang Guanting  梁冠霆, 留美青年的信仰追寻: 北美中国基督教学生运动研究, 1909-1951 = American-educated Chinese youths and their quest for the Christian faith : a study of the Chinese student Christian movement in North America, 1909-1951. 上海 : 上海人民出版社, 2010.
 Lin, Paul T. K. and Chen Lin, Eileen, In the eye of the China storm: a life between East and West. Montreal: McGill-Queen's University Press, 2011.
 Reviews of "In the Eye of the China Storm: A Life Between East & West," by Paul T.K. Lin and Eileen Chen Lin.
 1)     Noumoff, Sam; Labour, Capital & Society; 2011, Vol. 44 Issue 1, p207
 2)     Woo, Franklin J.; China Review International; 2011, Vol. 18 Issue 3, p358
 3)     Tisseyre, Michelle; Pacific Affairs; Mar2013, Vol. 86 Issue 1, p145
 Luo Yuanxu 羅元旭 (York Lo), 東成西就 : 七個華人基督教家族與中西交流百年 / 羅元旭著 = East and West : Chinese Christian families and their roles in two centuries of East-West relations. 香港 : 三聯書店(香港)有限公司, 2012.
 Song Luxia 宋路霞, 上海灘名門閨秀 . 台北市 : 秀威資訊科技股份有限公司, 2008.
 Tseng, Timothy, "Religious Liberalism, International Politics, and Diasporic Realities: The Chinese Students Christian Association of North America, 1909-1951", The Journal of American-East Asian Relations, Vol. 5, No. 3/4 (FALL-WINTER 1996), pp. 305–330
 Wang, Mengkui, Chinese economists on economic reform. Collected works of Wang Mengkui. Abingdon, Oxon : Routledge, 2014.
 Wickeri, Philip L., Reconstructing Christianity in China: K.H. Ting and the Chinese church. Maryknoll. N.Y. : Orbis Books, 2007.
 Zhang Xingxing, Selected essays on the history of contemporary China. Leiden : Brill, 2015.
 中國人名大詞典. 當代人物卷 (Liao Gailong 廖蓋隆, Luo Zhufeng 羅竹風, Fan Yuanzhu 范源 eds.). 上海 : 上海辭書出版社, 1992.

External links 
 Chronology of Other Events of UCLA’s Exchange Activities with China,  1972–90, by Sue W. Fan
 Paul Lin, Hong Kong University of Science and Technology Library Archives webpage

1920 births
2004 deaths
Canadian people of Chinese descent
Academic staff of McGill University
Members of the Order of Canada
Scientists from Vancouver
Canadian political scientists
Academic staff of the University of British Columbia
University of Michigan alumni
Academic staff of the University of Macau
Harvard University alumni
20th-century political scientists